Tommaso Turco (died 1649) was the Master of the Order of Preachers from 1644 to 1649.

Biography
He was born in Cremona and taught metaphysics at the University of Padua. Tommaso Turco was elected master at the 1644 Chapter of the Dominican Order, over the opposition of Pope Urban VIII, whose preferred candidate was Michel Mazarin, brother of Cardinal Mazarin.

As master, Turco conducted extensive visitations of Italy, Spain, the Kingdom of France, and the Spanish Netherlands.

He died in 1649.

References

1649 deaths
Italian Dominicans
Masters of the Order of Preachers
Year of birth unknown